
Year 325 BC was a year of the pre-Julian Roman calendar. At the time, it was known as the Year of the Consulship of Camillus and Scaeva (or, less frequently, year 429 Ab urbe condita). The denomination 325 BC for this year has been used since the early medieval period, when the Anno Domini calendar era became the prevalent method in Europe for naming years.

Events 
 By place 
 Europe 
 (around this year) - Pytheas made a voyage of naval exploration to northwestern Europe, reaching Britain and the Baltic Sea, and mentioning Thule as the farthest island to the north in the Atlantic.

 Macedonian Empire 
 Alexander the Great leaves India and nominates his officer Peithon, son of Agenor, as the satrap of the region around the Indus.
 Alexander the Great orders his admiral, Nearchus, to sail from the Hydaspes River in western India to the Persian Gulf and up the Euphrates River to Babylon while Alexander's army starts marching through Gedrosia (Baluchistan).
 While returning to Persia, Alexander's army runs into the Malli clans (in modern day Multan). The ensuing battle severely weakens his army. Alexander sends much of his remaining army to Carmania (modern southern Iran) with his general Craterus, while he leads the rest of his forces back to Persia by the southern route through the Gedrosian Desert (now part of southern Iran and Makran in southern Pakistan).
 By the end of the year, Alexander's army reaches Persepolis, while his navy, under Nearchus, reaches Susa at around the same time.
 The first known reference to sugar cane appears in writings by Alexander the Great's admiral Nearchus, who writes of Indian reeds "that produce honey, although there are no bees".

 Sicily 
 Agathocles, a rich and ambitious citizen of Syracuse, is exiled for attempting to overthrow the oligarchic party in the city.

 China 
 Going against his loyalty to the figurehead monarch of the Zhou Dynasty, the Qin ruler, Duke Huiwen, takes on the title of King Huiwen, claiming royal title and sparking a trend amongst other Warring States rulers to do the same.
 King Wuling ascends to the throne of Zhao.
 Americas 
La Venta, an Olmec island city, is believed to be completely abandoned by this time.

 By topic 

 Art 
 The fourth-century (Late Classical) period of sculpture ends in Ancient Greece and is succeeded by the Hellenistic period (approximate date).

 Philosophy 
 Aristotle writes Ta Ethika on virtue and moral character (approximate date).

Births 
 Euclid, Greek mathematician who will come to live in Alexandria (d. c. 275 BC)
 Gongsun Long, Chinese scholar and philosopher (approximate date)
 Zhaoxiang of Qin, Chinese king of the Qin State (d. 250 BC)

Deaths

References